Edward Stanley, 3rd Earl of Derby KG (c. 10 May 1509 – 24 October 1572) was an English nobleman and politician. He succeeded his father as Lord of Mann until his death, and then was succeeded by his son.

Early life
At the age of thirteen, Edward received the titles and estates of his father, the 2nd Earl of Derby, and King Henry VIII took responsibility for bringing him up until he was of age. His commissioners, including Cardinal Thomas Wolsey, were responsible for most of his affairs.

In 1528, he accompanied Cardinal Wolsey on a mission to France, and in 1530, he was one of the peers who gave Pope Clement VII the declaration regarding Henry's divorce from Catherine of Aragon.

Marriages and issue
That same year, Thomas Howard, 3rd Duke of Norfolk bought the remaining year of Edward Stanley's wardship and married him, without the King's permission, to his daughter, Katherine Howard. The King rebuked Norfolk, but allowed the marriage. Katherine fell victim to the plague a few weeks later. Undeterred, Norfolk arranged for a marriage  between his half-sister, Dorothy Howard, and Edward Stanley, with whom he had issue:
 Henry Stanley, 4th Earl of Derby
 Elizabeth (1533–1590) wife of Henry Parker, 11th Baron Morley
 Jane (d. 1569) wife of Edward Sutton, 4th Baron Dudley
 Mary (d. 1609) wife of Edward Stafford, 3rd Baron Stafford
 Thomas, grandfather of Venetia Stanley
 Anne, wife of Charles Stourton, 8th Baron Stourton, then of Sir John Arundell of Lanherne
 Margaret (d. 1585), widow of John Germin & 2nd wife of Sir Nicholas Poyntz (d. 1585/86) of Iron Acton, Glos.

Later career
In 1532, Edward accompanied King Henry to Boulogne, where they met with King Francis I of France. After this meeting, Edward became a Knight of the Bath. A few years later, Edward took a major role in quelling the Pilgrimage of Grace, a large (mainly church-related) rebellion started in Lincolnshire and spread into North England. In 1542, Edward accompanied the Duke of Norfolk on a raid into Scotland.

When Edward VI ascended to the throne in 1547, Edward became a Knight of the Garter, and in 1550, he was one of the peers who were present at the peace proceedings with Scotland and France. A year later, various charges were brought against him (with little or no evidence), mainly due to his opposition to clerical reform. However, when Queen Mary ascended to the throne, he was again in favour, and was appointed Lord High Steward and became a Privy Councillor. He was a commissioner of Lady Jane Grey's trial and was frequently present during the trials of accused heretics. He remained in favour under Queen Elizabeth I's reign, and remained on her Privy Council. She eventually appointed him Chamberlain of Chester.

Edward Stanley died at Lathom House, and his titles and estates were passed on to his eldest son, Henry Stanley.

Ancestry

Footnotes

References

External links
Stanley's patronage of theater and/or music: Patrons and Performances Web Site

|-

|-

|-

1509 births
1572 deaths
Knights of the Garter
Knights of the Bath
Lord High Stewards
Lord-Lieutenants of Cheshire
Lord-Lieutenants of Lancashire
Edward
16th-century English nobility
3
Monarchs of the Isle of Man
Barons Strange
Le Strange family
Barons Stanley